Harold Nathan Braunhut (March 31, 1926 – November 28, 2003), also known as Harold von Braunhut, was an American mail-order marketer and inventor most famous as the creator and seller of both the Amazing Sea-Monkeys and the X-ray specs. His grandfather, Tobias Cohn, was head of the T. Cohn Toy Company until the early 1940s.

Early life
Braunhut was born in Memphis, Tennessee, on March 31, 1926. He grew up in New York City and resided there until the 1980s, when he moved to Maryland. According to a report in The Washington Post, he was raised "as Harold Nathan Braunhut, a Jew" — notable in light of his later association with white supremacist groups. He added "von" to his name some time in the 1950s for a more Germanic sound and so he could distance himself from his Jewish family.

Business activities
Braunhut used comic book advertisements to sell an assortment of products, many of which were misleadingly advertised. He held 195 patents for various products, many of which have become cultural icons, including:
 X-ray specs, which advertisements claimed enabled the wearer to see through clothing and flesh. The product has appealed to generations of curious pre-adolescents.
 Amazing Sea-Monkeys, which were tiny brine shrimp eggs that "came to life" when water was added. Sales took an upswing when comic book illustrator Joe Orlando drew comic book advertisements showing the humanized Sea-Monkeys enjoying life in their underwater fantasy world. Billions of the tiny creatures have been sold over the years and have generated fan websites, a television series, and a video game. Astronaut John Glenn took 400 million "Amazing Sea-Monkeys" into space with him in 1998.
 Crazy Crabs, which were simply hermit crabs.
 Amazing Hair-Raising Monsters, a card with a printed monster that would grow "hair" (actually mineral crystals) when water was added.
 Invisible Goldfish, imaginary fish sold with a handbook, fish food and a glass bowl, that were guaranteed to remain permanently invisible.

Braunhut also raced motorcycles under the name "The Green Hornet", and managed a showman (Henry Lamore or Henri LaMothe) whose act consisted of diving  into a children's wading pool filled with only  of water, and the mentalist The great Dunninger. Braunhut also set up a wildlife conservation area in Maryland.

Racial views
The Washington Post stated in a report that, despite his Jewish ethnicity, he had a close association with white supremacist groups, buying firearms for a Ku Klux Klan faction and regularly attending the Aryan Nations annual conference. “Hendrik von Braun" operated an organization calling itself the "National Anti-Zionist Institute" from the same Bryans Road, Maryland address that von Braunhut used to sell Sea Monkey merchandise. In a 1988 interview with The Seattle Times, he referred to the "inscrutable, slanty Korean eyes" of Korean shop owners and was quoted as saying, "You know what side I'm on. I don't make any bones about it."

Personal life
Von Braunhut first married Charlotte Braunhut. His second marriage was to actress Yolanda Signorelli, who took an active role in marketing Sea-Monkeys. They had a son, Jonathan, and a daughter, Jeanette LaMothe.

Harold von Braunhut died on November 28, 2003, at his home in Indian Head, Maryland, following an accidental fall.

References

1926 births
2003 deaths
20th-century American inventors
Accidental deaths from falls
Accidental deaths in Maryland
American people of Jewish descent
Critics_of_Judaism
People from Memphis, Tennessee
Toy controversies
Toy inventors
American white supremacists
American fraudsters